Poopara  is a village in Idukki district in the Indian state of Kerala. It is located in the cardamom-growing region of Kerala, and also houses a number of tea and coffee plantations.  The place also intersects the Munnar - Kumily state highway (SH-19) and Kochi - Dhanushkodi national highway (NH-49). The Anayirankal reservoir is 4 km up the road from Poopara.

Demographics
As of 2011 Census, Poopara had a population of 8,231 with 4,137 males and 4,094 females. In Poopara, 8.8% of the total population was under 6 years of age. Poopara had an average literacy of 77.9% higher than the national average of 74% and lower than state average of 94%.

References

Villages in Idukki district